Kibwezi Constituency was an electoral constituency in Kenya. It was one of five constituencies in Makueni District. The constituency was established for the 1988 elections. After the 2010 constitution, there were six constituencies set up in Makueni County, with Kibwezi Constituency being split into Kibwezi West Constituency and Kibwezi East Constituency.

The towns of Kibwezi, Makindu and Mtito Andei were located within this constituency.

Members of Parliament

Locations and wards

References

External links 
Map of the constituency

Makueni County
Constituencies in Eastern Province (Kenya)
1988 establishments in Kenya
Constituencies established in 1988
Former constituencies of Kenya